Live Sweet Basil is a live album by jazz composer, arranger, conductor and pianist Gil Evans recorded by King Records (Japan) in New York in 1984 featuring Evans with his Monday Night Orchestra which included George Adams, Howard Johnson, and Lew Soloff and originally released in the US on the Gramavision label.

Background
Gil Evans' Monday night marathon sessions at "Sweet Basil Jazz Club" was originally a started as a workshop in April 1983 to select players and do rehearsals for preparing his Japan tour in May. As the performance at the workshop got attentions and had good reputation, the club asked Gil to continue the stage periodically on Monday from June, after the Japan tour.

Reception
AllMusic awarded the album 2 stars, stating, "It may not have been "cool," but it was most assuredly great jazz".

Track listing
 "Parabola" (Alan Shorter) - 18:40   
 "Voodoo Child (Slight Return)" (Jimi Hendrix) - 7:21   
 "Orange Was the Color of Her Dress, Then Silk Blue" (Charles Mingus) - 6:15   
 "Prince of Darkness" (Herbie Hancock) - 5:50   
 "Blues in "C": John's Memory/Cheryl/Bird Feathers/Relaxin' at Camarillo" (Charlie Parker) - 24:42 
 "Goodbye Pork Pie Hat" (Mingus) - 9:30 Omitted from CD reissue    
 "Up from the Skies" (Hendrix) - 8:39

Personnel
Gil Evans - piano, electric piano, arranger, conductor
Lew Soloff, Hannibal Marvin Peterson, Shunzo Ohno, Miles Evans - trumpet
George Adams - tenor saxophone
Chris Hunter - alto saxophone 
Howard Johnson - tuba, baritone saxophone, bass clarinet  
Tom Malone - trombone  
Hiram Bullock - guitar
Pete Levin - synthesizer  
Mark Egan - electric bass  
Adam Nussbaum - drums  
Mino Cinelu - percussion

References 

1986 live albums
Gil Evans live albums
Albums arranged by Gil Evans